Nucleophosmin (NPM), also known as nucleolar phosphoprotein B23 or  numatrin, is a protein that in humans is encoded by the NPM1 gene.

Function 

NPM1 is associated with nucleolar ribonucleoprotein structures and binds single-stranded and double-stranded nucleic acids, but it binds preferentially G-quadruplex forming nucleic acids. It is involved in the biogenesis of ribosomes and may assist small basic proteins in their transport to the nucleolus. Its regulation through SUMOylation (by SENP3 and SENP5) is another facet of the protein's regulation and cellular functions.

It is located in the nucleolus, but it can be translocated to the nucleoplasm in case of serum starvation or treatment with anticancer drugs.  The protein is phosphorylated.

Nucleophosmin has multiple functions:
 Histone chaperones
 Ribosome biogenesis and transport
 Genomic stability and DNA repair
 Endoribonuclease activity
 Centrosome duplication during cell cycle
 Regulation of ARF-p53 tumor suppressor pathway
 RNA helix destabilizing activity
 Inhibition of caspase-activated DNase
 Prevents apoptosis when located in nucleolus

Clinical significance 

NPM1 gene is up-regulated, mutated and chromosomally translocated in many tumor types. Chromosomal aberrations involving NPM1 were found in patients with non-Hodgkin lymphoma, acute promyelocytic leukemia, myelodysplastic syndrome, and acute myelogenous leukemia. Heterozygous mice for NPM1 are vulnerable to tumor development. In solid tumors NPM1 is frequently found overexpressed, and it is thought that NPM1 could promote tumor growth by inactivation of the tumor suppressor p53/ARF pathway; on the contrary, when expressed at low levels, NPM1 could suppress tumor growth by the inhibition of centrosome duplication.

Of high importance is NPM involvement in acute myelogenous leukemia, where a mutated protein lacking a folded C-terminal domain (NPM1c+) has been found in the cytoplasm in patients. This aberrant localization has been linked to the development of the disease, and is associated with improved clinical outcomes. Strategies against this subtype of acute myelogenous leukemia include the refolding of the C-terminal domain using pharmalogical chaperones and the displacement of the protein from nucleolus to nucleoplasm, which has been linked to apoptotic mechanisms. It has also been shown that in the context of clonal hematopoiesis of undetermined significance harboring a DNMT3A mutation, subsequent NPM1 mutations drive progression into overt myeloproliferative neoplasm.

Interactions 

NPM1 has been shown to interact with 
 AKT1,
 BARD1,
 BRCA1, and
 nucleolin.

Nucleophosmin has multiple binding partners:
 rRNA
 HIV Rev and Rex peptide
 p53 tumor suppressor
 ARF tumor suppressor
 MDM2 (mouse double minute 2, ubiquitin ligase)
 Ribosome protein S9
 Phosphatidylinositol 3,4,5-triphosphate (PIP3)
 Exportin-1 (CRM1, chromosome region maintenance)
 Nucleolin/C23
 Transcription target of myc oncogene

References

Further reading 

 
 
 
 
 
 
 
 
 
 
 
 
 
 
 
 
 
 
 
 
 
 

Genes on human chromosome 5